The 2016 Puskás Cup was the ninth edition of the Puskás Cup and took place between 13 May to 16 May in Felcsút, Hungary. Budapest Honvéd were the defending champions. One new team, Genk Jeugd, were invited by the organisers for this event.

The 2016 Puskás Cup was won by Budapest Honvéd by beating Puskás Akadémia in penalty shootout in the final on 16 May 2016 at the Pancho Arena in Felcsút. La Fábrica finished third by beating Genk Jeugd 3-1. Hagi Academy finished fifth by beating Panathinaikos 2-1.

Participating teams
 Budapest Honvéd (former club of Ferenc Puskás)
 La Fábrica (former club of Ferenc Puskás)
 Hagi Academy (invited)
 Genk Jeugd (invited)
 Panathinaikos (former club of Ferenc Puskás)
 Puskás Akadémia (host)

Venues

Squads

Budapest Honvéd
Coach: Krisztián Somogyi

La Fábrica
Coach: Tristán David Celador

Genk Jeugd
Coach: Eddy Vanhemel

Hagi Academy
Coach: Nicolae Rosca

Panathinaikos
Coach: Henk Herder

Puskás Akadémia
Coach: Ivica Kulesevic

Results
All times are local (UTC+2).

Group A

Group B

Fifth place play-off

Third place play-off

Final

Statistics

Goalscorers
4 goals 
  Zsombor Bévárdi (Puskás Akadémia)

2 goals 
  Safouane Ahidar (Genk Jeugd)
  Benjámin Pratsler (Budapest Honvéd)
  Román Adrián Moreno (La Fábrica)

1 goal 
  Zoltán Bence Banó-Szabó (Budapest Honvéd)
  Nikolasz Kovács (Budapest Honvéd)
  Milán Májer (Budapest Honvéd)
  Antonio Manuel Casas Marin (La Fábrica)
  Garcia Alberto Fernandez (La Fábrica)
  Rodriguez Inaki Elejalde (La Fábrica)
  Adrián de la Fuente Barquilla (La Fábrica)
  Elliot Gómez López (La Fábrica)
  Adriano Bertaccini (Genk Jeugd)
  Emeraude Molembia Bolingoli (Genk Jeugd)
  Denis Dragus (Hagi Academy)
  Romeo Branica (Hagi Academy)
  Catalin Itu (Hagi Academy)
  Robert Neciu (Hagi Academy)
  Alexandru Matan (Hagi Academy)
  Igli Doko (Panathinaikos)
  Gergely Mim (Puskás Akadémia)
  Balázs Varga (Puskás Akadémia)

References

External links
Official website

2016
2015–16 in Spanish football
2015–16 in Hungarian football
2015–16 in Greek football
2015–16 in Romanian football
2015–16 in Belgian football